Samson v. California, 547 U.S. 843 (2006), is a United States Supreme Court case in which the Court affirmed the California Court of Appeal's ruling that suspicionless searches of parolees are lawful under California law and that the search in this case was reasonable under the Fourth Amendment to the United States Constitution because it was not arbitrary, capricious, or harassing.

This case answered in the affirmative a variation of the question the Court left open in United States v. Knights, 534 U.S. 112, 120 n.6 (2001), "whether a condition of release can so diminish or eliminate a released prisoner's reasonable expectation of privacy that a suspicionless search by a law enforcement officer would not offend the Fourth Amendment."

Background

Police search 
In the afternoon of September 6, 2002, San Bruno Police Officer Alex Rohleder observed "two adults and a little baby walking down the street."  One of the adults, whom Rohleder recognized "from a prior contact" was the defendant in the case, Donald Curtis Samson. Rohleder knew that Samson was on parole and had heard from other officers that Samson "might have a parolee at large warrant." Rohleder then parked his police vehicle and approached Samson and "made contact" with him.

When Rohleder asked Samson if he had a warrant, Samson replied that he did not and "was in good standing with his parole agent." Rohleder confirmed over his police radio that Samson was not subject to a parole warrant, but was on parole for a prior parole violation. Rohleder conducted a search of Samson due to his status as a parolee. One of Samson's conditions of parole stated that he had agreed to "search and seizure by a parole officer or other peace officer at any time of the night or day, with or without a search warrant or with or without cause." This condition is required by California Penal Code Section 3067.(a).

Rohleder found a cigarette box in Samson's left breast pocket that held a plastic baggie containing methamphetamine. Samson was arrested and later charged with violating California Health and Safety Code Ann. §11377(a), for possessing the methamphetamine.

State court trial and appeal
At trial, Samson moved to suppress the methamphetamine evidence, which was denied by the trial court. The court found that Cal. Penal Code Ann. §3067(a) authorized the search and that the search was not "arbitrary or capricious." The jury convicted Samson and the trial court sentenced him to seven years in prison. 

Samson appealed his conviction on the grounds the trial court improperly admitted the evidence from the search. The California Court of Appeal affirmed the trial court's ruling, relying on People v. Reyes, 19 Cal. 4th 743, 968 P. 2d 445 (1998), in which the court held that: suspicionless searches of parolees are lawful under California law; that " '[s]uch a search is reasonable within the meaning of the Fourth Amendment as long as it is not arbitrary, capricious or harassing' "; and that the search in this case was not arbitrary, capricious, or harassing.

References

External links 
 

United States Supreme Court cases
United States Supreme Court cases of the Roberts Court
United States Fourth Amendment case law
2006 in United States case law